Taraxacum pankhurstianum, also known as the St Kilda dandelion, is a species of dandelion that was identified as new in 2012 after being cultivated at the Royal Botanic Garden Edinburgh from seeds collected two years previously on the island of Hirta, the largest island in the St Kilda archipelago, on the western edge of Scotland.

The species was named for Richard Pankhurst, a retired staff member at the garden who suggested that the seeds be collected.

It was described in A. J. Richards & C. C. Ferguson-Smyth, New Journal of Botany 2(1): 16. 2012 [31 May 2012].

Description
It is the presence of unique hairy exterior bracts on the flower bud that led botanists to believe it is a new species of Asteraceae, the largest family of flowering plants. The St Kilda dandelion is also much smaller than the common dandelion.

History
The plant has, so far, only been found on the island of Hirta which was abandoned by its last residents in 1930. Botanists believe it may be endemic to the area and among the rarest plants in Scotland's flora.  It may be rare on St Kilda because it is eaten by animals including sheep and perhaps, some birds.

The flower may have originated in Iceland and been carried to Hirta by birds, or the Vikings.

References

pankhurstianum
Endemic biota of the Scottish islands
Endemic flora of Scotland
St Kilda, Scotland
Plants described in 2012